Board Camp is an unincorporated community and census-designated place (CDP) in Polk County, Arkansas, United States. Board Camp has a post office with ZIP code 71932.

It was first listed as a CDP in the 2020 census with a population of 87.

Demographics

2020 census

Note: the US Census treats Hispanic/Latino as an ethnic category. This table excludes Latinos from the racial categories and assigns them to a separate category. Hispanics/Latinos can be of any race.

References

Unincorporated communities in Polk County, Arkansas
Unincorporated communities in Arkansas
Census-designated places in Polk County, Arkansas
Census-designated places in Arkansas